Heyshope Dam is a zoned earth-fill type dam located on the Assegaai River, Mpumalanga, South Africa. It was established in 1986. The main purpose for the dam being built was to service White communities around the Vaal triangle of the old Transvaal. The hazard potential of the dam construction has been ranked high (3).

See also
List of reservoirs and dams in South Africa
List of rivers of South Africa

References 

 List of South African Dams from the Department of Water Affairs and Forestry (South Africa)

Dams in South Africa
Dams completed in 1983